Pictures of the Other Side is the third studio album to have been released by British singer-songwriter and former Pop Idol runner-up, Gareth Gates. The album was released nearly four years after his second album, Go Your Own Way, due to a change in record label, from Sony BMG to Universal. The album was produced entirely by Martin Terefe and production duo Kissing the Pink. Just two singles were released from the album: "Changes" and "Angel on My Shoulder". The album peaked at number 23 on the UK Albums Chart. Gates has since announced that he has no plans to release a fourth album in the future.

Track listing

Charts

References

2007 albums
Gareth Gates albums
19 Recordings albums
Universal Music Group albums